Leo Peyton (November 4, 1899 – April 9, 1989), sometimes listed as Leo Payton, was an American football player. He played professional football a fullback for the Rochester Jeffersons in the National Football League (NFL). He grew up in Canton, New York, and appeared in six NFL games, four as a starter, during the 1923 and 1924 seasons.

References

1899 births
1989 deaths
Rochester Jeffersons players
Players of American football from New York (state)